The Ferals is an Australian children's comedy television series which screened on the ABC from 1994 to 1995. It was created by Wendy Gray and Claire Henderson and featured a mixture of people and animal puppets known as the "Ferals." It was lauded for its irreverent humour and distinctive characters, some of which featured on other ABC programming. Garth Frost was responsible for the puppet design.

Series overview

Season 1 (1994)

Season 2 (1995)

References

Lists of Australian children's television series episodes
Lists of Australian comedy television series episodes